"And Fools Shine On" is a song by the American rock band Brother Cane. It was released in 1995 as the lead single from their second album, Seeds. The song reached number-one on the US Billboard Album Rock Tracks chart, ranking at number 5 on the year-end mainstream rock chart. The song also reached number 12 in Canada on the RPM Top Singles chart.

The song was used in the movie Halloween: The Curse of Michael Myers.

Track listing

Charts

Weekly charts

Year-end charts

Personnel
 Damon Johnson – vocals, guitar
 David Anderson – guitar
 Roman Glick – bass guitar
 Joey Huffman – keyboards
 Scott Collier – drums

References

1995 songs
Brother Cane songs
Virgin Records singles
Songs written by Marti Frederiksen
Songs written by Damon Johnson